Hinton is a dispersed settlement in the civil parish of Bransgore, in the English county of Hampshire.

Hinton is centred on the main A35 road northeast of Christchurch and gives its name to both Hinton House and Hinton Admiral. For local government purposes it is in the civil parish of Bransgore and the district of the New Forest.

It is served by the main-line Hinton Admiral railway station.

East Close House is a house of historical significance and is listed in the English Heritage Register. The village was the seat of the 18th century Stewkley Baronetcy.

External links

Hamlets in Hampshire
New Forest